The  ōū (pronounced ) (Psittirostra psittacea) is a species of Hawaiian honeycreeper endemic to the Hawaiian islands. It has a dark green back and olive green underparts; males have a yellow head while females have a green head. Its unusual beak seems to be adapted to feeding on the fruits of Freycinetia arborea. It has a strong flight which it uses to fly considerable distances in search of this vine, but it will eat other fruits, buds, flowers and insects.

Although formerly widespread and present throughout the island group, numbers declined dramatically during the twentieth century. The bird is listed by the International Union for Conservation of Nature as being Critically Endangered, but there are no recent records and it may be extinct. The last recorded sighting was in 1989.

Description

Males have a bright yellow head, dark green back, and an olive-green belly. Females are duller with an olive-green head. The ōū has a pink, finch-like bill and pink legs.

Behavior
The breeding biology of this bird is unknown, although juveniles have been seen in June, suggesting a March to May breeding season. The ōū’s call is an ascending or descending whistle that may break into a sweet and distinct canary-like song.

Its unique bill was apparently adapted for feeding on the fruits of the ieie (Freycinetia arborea) vine, although when the fruiting season ended the ōū readily moved both up the slope and downslope in search of other foods, both native and introduced. In addition to fruits, it feeds on insects, and buds and blossoms of the ōhia lehua (Metrosideros polymorpha). It was known to have been a nomadic forager that made strong flights to follow seasonally available fruit crops across a broad elevational gradient.

Status
Though it was formerly widespread on the six largest islands of that group, this Hawaiian honeycreeper declined precipitously from the turn of the 20th century. The last recorded sighting was in 1989 on Kauai. It is almost certainly extinct there, but unconfirmed reports occasionally are received from the areas above the Kīlauea volcano on the island of Hawaii. As a consequence, it is retained as critically endangered by BirdLife International (and thereby IUCN) until it is proven to be extinct beyond reasonable doubt. The largest and most secure population above Waiākea were driven from its habitat in 1984 when the area was devastated by a lava flow from Mauna Loa. The ōū was restricted to the mid-elevation ōhia lehua (Metrosideros polymorpha) forests of the Big Island and the Alakai Wilderness Preserve on Kauai. More recently it became restricted to ōhia lehua forest.

The ōū is one of the most mobile species of Hawaiian honeycreepers. Although it was not very active and usually slow-moving, it had remarkable stamina and when flying, would cover great distances. It is one of the few Hawaiian endemics that did occur on all the major islands at one time and did not differentiate into subspecies, suggesting that birds crossed between islands on a regular basis. Also, there was considerable seasonal movement between different altitudes according to the availability of the species' favorite food, the bracts and fruit of the ieie (Freycinetia arborea). This probably was the species' undoing, as it thus came in contact with mosquitoes transmitting avian malaria and fowlpox, which are exceptionally lethal to most Hawaiian honeycreepers. Other significant threats to this species are habitat loss and introduced predators. Island species are particularly vulnerable to one or more of these threats because of their low numbers and restricted geographical distributions.

Protection 
The ōū  was listed as an endangered species in 1967 under the Endangered Species Act. The Kauai Forest Birds Recovery Plan was published in 1983 and the Hawaii Forest Birds Recovery Plan was published in 1984. These recovery plans recommend active land management, controlling the spread of introduced plants and animals, closely monitoring new land activity or development to prevent further destruction of forest bird habitat, and the establishment of captive propagation and sperm bank programs. The ōū was last seen in the Olaa area of the Big Island. Today this area is protected by a multiparty group including state, federal, and private entities.

References

External links
 BirdLife Species Factsheet
 Audubon WatchList
 USFWS
 University of Hawaiʻi at Mānoa (not in english), account in Hawaiʻian

O'u
O'u
O'u
O'u
O'u
O'u
ESA endangered species